Diana Graciela Goral is an Argentine lawyer.

Biography 
Goral has been a General Attorney in the Criminal Oral Court of Buenos Aires (DF) since 1993. Her career began in 1980 as First Instance Secretary of the Court of Civil, Commercial, and Labor Instruction in Charata, in the province of Chaco, and later in the Chaco seat of Villa Ángela she was designated First Instance and Second Instance Secretary of the Correctional Court, and Criminal Offenses. In 1984, in the city Resistencia, she was named Electoral Secretary of Chamber of Crime no. 2.

Her experience in oral courts led her to participation as a keynote, teacher, or special guest in international institutions such as the International Institute of Higher Studies in Criminal Sciences and in distinguished international universities.

She has been summoned to analyze principal themes like gender violence, organized crime, information crimes, and medical responsibility. She is a full member of the International Association of Penal Law, based in France.        

She first gained notice for arguing that hair is very important to women and it takes a long time to grow, so an injury to it may be considered a serious injury. Also, she demanded a two-year prison term for a lesbian couple that kissed in public and failed to obey a non-smoking area, even when sexual orientation isn't a crime and there weren't any no smoking signs posted.

She is a professor at the University of Buenos Aires as a Professor of Elements of Criminal Law and Criminal Procedure. She is a tenured professor of Criminal Law General Part and Criminal Law Special Part at the University of Salta. She has given seminars at the Federal Police University Institute. She graduated as a lawyer from the Catholic University of La Plata, and then did a postgraduate degree in "Improvement in narcotics and psychotropics" at the Catholic University of Salta and the University of Bari Aldo Moro Studies (CEE) to complete the "Complex Investigation Seminar" sponsored by the FBI and the Embassy of the United States.

Teaching 
Goral is Professor of Elements of Criminal Law and Criminal Process at the University of Buenos Aires, and Titular Professor of Criminal Law and Special Part at the Catholic University of Salta, in addition to having been a teacher at various institutions of higher learning in Argentina.

Education and awards 

Publications 
Among her publications are the book Imputabilidad disminuida and writings such as “El Crimen Organizado en el Mercosur” (L.I.R.A, 1999), “El desbaratamiento de Derechos acordados y su relación con las obligaciones en el Derecho Civil”, (Plus Ultra, 2002), and others.

Causes 
Goral is, together with her colleagues Guillermo Marijuan, Carlos Stornelli, Gerardo Moldes, Ricardo Sáenz, Raúl Pleé, and José María Campagnoli, one of the organizers of the 18F March, in homage to Alberto Nisman.

References

External links 
 Imputabilidad disminuida
 Cargo a partir de Designación Ministerio Público Fiscal
 Se incendió el despacho de una fiscal 
 Condenaron a prisión perpetua al hombre que arrojó por el balcón a su esposa
 El sommelier Luciano Sosto fue condenado a prisión perpetua por el crimen de su madre

Year of birth missing (living people)
Living people
20th-century Argentine lawyers
Argentine women lawyers
21st-century Argentine lawyers